Swindale Beck is a stream in Cumbria, England. It is formed at Swindale Head where Mosedale Beck, from the slopes of Tarn Crag, joins Hobgrumble Beck from Selside Pike. The stream flows north-east along Swindale and joins the River Lowther near Rosgill between Shap and Bampton. Its waters then flow via the 
River Eamont into the Solway Firth.

It had been straightened to clear land for grazing, before 1859. but in 2016, 750 m of straightened channel was replaced with 890 m of a new sinuous channel, reconnecting the stream to its surrounding floodplain. This resulted in a rapid and marked improvement in its diversity. In 2022 the project was awarded the European Riverprize.

References

External links

Ecological restoration
1Swindale
Rivers of Cumbria